Sceloporus druckercolini, also known commonly as the graceful mountain tree lizard and lagartija elegante arborícola de montaña in Mexican Spanish, is a species of lizard in the family Phrynosomatidae. The species is endemic to Mexico.

Etymology
The specific name, druckercolini, is in honor of Mexican scientist René Raúl Drucker-Colín.

Geographic range
S. druckercolini is found in southern Mexico, in the Mexican state of Guerrero.

Habitat

Reproduction
The mode of reproduction of S. druckercolini is unknown.

References

Further reading
Palacios-Aguilar R (2020). "Una lista comentada de las especies de anfibios y reptiles con localidad tipo en Guerrero, México". Revista Latinoamericana de Herpetología 3 (2): 43–60. (in Spanish).
Palacios-Aguilar R, Flores-Villela O (2018). "An updated checklist of the herpetofauna from Guerrero, Mexico". Zootaxa 4422 (1): 1–24.
Pérez-Ramos E, Saldaña-de La Riva L (2008). "Morphological Revision of Lizards of the formosus Group, Genus Sceloporus (Squamata: Sauria) of Southern México, with Description of a New Species". Bulletin of the Maryland Herpetological Society 44 (3): 77–98. (Sceloporus druckercolini, new species). (in English, with an abstract in Spanish).

Sceloporus
Endemic reptiles of Mexico
Reptiles described in 2008